"Icy" is the debut single by Gucci Mane from his album Trap House. It features rappers Young Jeezy and Boo of the group Boo & Gotti.

A dispute over whose song it was first was the source of a feud between Jeezy and Gucci Mane. The beef between them ended on November 19, 2020 when they performed the song together on their Verzuz battle in Atlanta.

Charts

References

2005 debut singles
Gucci Mane songs
Jeezy songs
Songs written by Gucci Mane
Song recordings produced by Zaytoven
Songs written by Zaytoven
2005 songs
Songs written by Jeezy